Steven William Forrest (7 February 1960 – 7 December 2021) was a Scottish singer-songwriter, best known for his time as a member of synth pop band Bronski Beat, with Jimmy Somerville and Larry Steinbachek.

Career
He was a co-founder and keyboard player of the group Bronski Beat, known for the singles "Smalltown Boy" and "Why?". He was also an LGBTQ activist and was openly gay from an early age.

Raised in Castlemilk, Glasgow, Bronski worked in his youth as a labourer. He lived in a flat in Brixton, London, during the early formative period of Bronski Beat with his fellow musicians. Later on he squatted with partner and bandmate Larry Steinbachek in Camberwell, London. Following the break up of the band he lived in Thailand for many years, as well as Paris, France, before returning to the United Kingdom.

In 2016, Larry Steinbachek died after a short battle with cancer. Bronski had a stroke in 2018 which limited his mobility. He died from smoke inhalation in a fire at his home in Soho, London, on 7 December 2021, at the age of 61.

References

1960 births
2021 deaths
20th-century Scottish LGBT people
20th-century Scottish male singers
21st-century Scottish LGBT people
21st-century Scottish male singers
Accidental deaths in London
british synth-pop new wave musicians
Bronski Beat members
Deaths by smoke inhalation
Gay singers
Scottish LGBT singers
Musicians from Glasgow
Scottish new wave musicians
Scottish gay musicians